The 2014 Motorcycle Grand Prix of the Americas was the second round of the 2014 MotoGP season. It was held at the Circuit of the Americas in Austin on April 13, 2014.

Classification

MotoGP

Moto2

Moto3

Championship standings after the race (MotoGP)
Below are the standings for the top five riders and constructors after round two has concluded.

Riders' Championship standings

Constructors' Championship standings

 Note: Only the top five positions are included for both sets of standings.

References

Motorcycle Grand Prix of the Americas
Americas
Motorcycle Grand Prix
Motorcycle Grand Prix of the Americas
Motorcycle Grand Prix of the Americas